Anatoliy Terentiyovych Novikov (17 January 1947 – 18 January 2022) was a Ukrainian judoka who competed for the Soviet Union in the 1972 Summer Olympics.

Novikov was born in Kharkiv on 17 January 1947. In 1972 he won the bronze medal in the half middleweight class. He died on 18 January 2022, at the age of 75.

References

External links

profile

1947 births
2022 deaths
Sportspeople from Kharkiv
Russian male judoka
Ukrainian male judoka
Soviet male judoka
Olympic judoka of the Soviet Union
Judoka at the 1972 Summer Olympics
Olympic bronze medalists for the Soviet Union
Olympic medalists in judo
Medalists at the 1972 Summer Olympics